Schizogoniidae is an extinct family of fossil sea snails, marine gastropod mollusks in the clade Vetigastropoda (according to the taxonomy of the Gastropoda by Bouchet & Rocroi, 2005).

This family is unassigned to superfamily. This family has no subfamilies.

Genera 
Genera within the family Scizogoniidae include:
 Schizogonium Koken, 1889 - the type genus

References